The Muse is a soundtrack released by singer Elton John in August 1999 for the original motion picture The Muse.  The album is a departure for John, as it is mainly the orchestrated score of the film, which he wrote in its entirety.  The only vocal track is the title track, which was co-written with longtime lyricist Bernie Taupin.

It was his third soundtrack following the release of Friends in 1971 and The Lion King in 1994.  It preceded the Broadway cast version of Elton John and Tim Rice's Aida (2000) although a concept album version in advance of the show was released in 1999.

Track listing
All compositions by Elton John except "The Muse", lyrics by Bernie Taupin.
 "Driving Home"
 "Driving to Universal"
 "Driving to Jack's"
 "Walk of Shame"
 "Better Have a Gift"
 "The Wrong Gift"
 "The Aquarium"
 "Are We Laughing"
 "Take a Walk with Me"
 "What Should I Do?"
 "Back to the Aquarium"
 "Steven Redecorates"
 "To the Guesthouse"
 "The Cookie Factory"
 "Multiple Personality"
 "Sarah Escapes"
 "Back to Paramount"
 "Meet Christine"
 "The Muse"
 "The Muse" (remixed by Jermaine Dupri)

1999 soundtrack albums
Elton John soundtracks
+Soundtracks
Comedy film soundtracks